Charles Allcock (16 April 1855 – 30 September 1947) was an English cricketer. He played five first-class matches for Cambridge University Cricket Club between 1878 and 1884.

See also
 List of Cambridge University Cricket Club players

References

External links
 

1855 births
1947 deaths
English cricketers
Cambridge University cricketers
People from Harborne
Marylebone Cricket Club cricketers
The Rest cricketers
Buckinghamshire cricketers